Garab (also Romanized as Garāb, Garrāb, and Garrūp) is a village in Dehpir-e Shomali Rural District, in the Central District of Khorramabad County, Lorestan Province, Iran. At the 2006 census, its population was 495, in 105 families.

References 

Towns and villages in Khorramabad County